In computer programming, leaning toothpick syndrome (LTS) is the situation in which a quoted expression becomes unreadable because it contains a large number of escape characters, usually backslashes ("\"), to avoid delimiter collision.

The official Perl documentation introduced the term to wider usage; there, the phrase is used to describe regular expressions that match Unix-style paths, in which the elements are separated by slashes /. The slash is also used as the default regular expression delimiter, so to be used literally in the expression, it must be escaped with a backslash  \, leading to frequent escaped slashes represented as \/. If doubled, as in URLs, this yields \/\/ for an escaped //. A similar phenomenon occurs for DOS/Windows paths, where the backslash is used as a path separator, requiring a doubled backslash \\ – this can then be re-escaped for a regular expression inside an escaped string, requiring \\\\ to match a single backslash. In extreme cases, such as a regular expression in an escaped string, matching a Uniform Naming Convention path (which begins \\) requires 8 backslashes \\\\\\\\ due to 2 backslashes each being double-escaped.

LTS appears in many programming languages and in many situations, including in patterns that match Uniform Resource Identifiers (URIs) and in programs that output quoted text. Many quines fall into the latter category.

Pattern example
Consider the following Perl regular expression intended to match URIs that identify files under the pub directory of an FTP site:

m/ftp:\/\/[^\/]*\/pub\//

Perl, like sed before it, solves this problem by allowing many other characters to be delimiters for a regular expression. For example, the following three examples are equivalent to the expression given above:

m{ftp://[^/]*/pub/}
m#ftp://[^/]*/pub/#
m!ftp://[^/]*/pub/!

Or this common translation to convert backslashes to forward slashes:

tr/\\/\//

may be easier to understand when written like this:

tr{\\}{/}

Quoted-text example
A Perl program to print an HTML link tag, where the URL and link text are stored in variables $url and $text respectively, might look like this. Notice the use of backslashes to escape the quoted double-quote characters:

print "<a href=\"$url\">$text</a>";

Using single quotes to delimit the string is not feasible, as Perl does not expand variables inside single-quoted strings.  The code below, for example, would not work as intended:

print '<a href="$url">$text</a>'

Using the printf function is a viable solution in many languages (Perl, C, PHP):

printf('<a href="%s">%s</a>', $url, $text);

The qq operator in Perl allows for any delimiter:

print qq{<a href="$url">$text</a>};
print qq|<a href="$url">$text</a>|;
print qq(<a href="$url">$text</a>);

Here documents are especially well suited for multi-line strings; however, Perl here documents hadn't allowed for proper indentation before v5.26. This example shows the Perl syntax:

print <<HERE_IT_ENDS;
<a href="$url">$text</a>
HERE_IT_ENDS

Other languages

C#

The C# programming language handles LTS by the use of the @ symbol at the start of string literals, before the initial quotation marks, e.g.

string filePath = @"C:\Foo\Bar.txt";

rather than otherwise requiring:

string filePath = "C:\\Foo\\Bar.txt";

C++

The C++11 standard adds raw strings:
std::string filePath = R"(C:\Foo\Bar.txt)";
If the string contains the characters )", an optional delimiter can be used, such as d in the following example:
std::regex re{ R"d(s/"\([^"]*\)"/'\1'/g)d" };

Go

Go indicates that a string is raw by using the backtick as a delimiter:
s := `C:\Foo\Bar.txt`
Raw strings may contain any character except backticks; there is no escape code for a backtick in a raw string. Raw strings may also span multiple lines, as in this example, where the strings s and t are equivalent:
s := `A string that
spans multiple
lines.`
t := "A string that\nspans multiple\nlines."

Python

Python has a similar construct using r:

filePath = r"C:\Foo\Bar.txt"

One can also use them together with triple quotes:

example = r"""First line : "C:\Foo\Bar.txt"
Second line : nothing"""

Ruby

Ruby uses single quote to indicate raw string:

filePath = 'C:\Foo\Bar.txt'

It also has regex percent literals with choice of delimiter like Perl:

%r{ftp://[^/]*/pub/}
%r#ftp://[^/]*/pub/#
%r!ftp://[^/]*/pub/!

Rust

Rust uses a variant of the r prefix:

"\x52";               // R
r"\x52";              // \x52
r#""foo""#;           // "foo"
r##"foo #"# bar"##;   // foo #"# bar

The literal starts with r followed by any number of #, followed by one ". Further " contained in the literal are considered part of the literal, unless followed by at least as many # as used after the opening r.

Scala

Scala allows usage of triple quotes in order to prevent escaping confusion:

val filePath = """C:\Foo\Bar.txt"""
val pubPattern = """ftp://[^/]*/pub/"""r

The triple quotes also allow for multiline strings, as shown here:

val text = """First line,
second line."""

Sed
Sed regular expressions, particularly those using the "s" operator, are much similar to Perl (sed is a predecessor to Perl). For example, to match a "pub" directory (as in the Perl example) and replace it with "foo", the default (escaping the slashes) is

s/ftp:\/\/[^\/]*\/pub\//foo/

Using an exclamation point ("!") as delimiter instead yields

s!ftp://[^/]*/pub/!foo!

See also
 Magic quotes
 String literal

References

Software engineering folklore
Perl
PHP
Articles with example Perl code
Regular expressions
Articles with example Python (programming language) code